

Mainline highways

Special routes

See also

References

External links

MnDOT Roadway Data
The Unofficial Minnesota Highways Page, by Steve Riner
Twin Cities Highways, by Adam Froehlig

 
U.S. Highways

es:Anexo:Carreteras estatales de Minnesota#Rutas federales